The 1961 New South Wales Rugby Football League premiership was the 54th season of the rugby league competition based in Sydney. Ten teams from across the city competed for the J J Giltinan Shield and WD & HO Wills Cup during the season, which culminated in a grand final between St. George and Western Suburbs.

Season summary
Ten Sydney-based clubs participated in the competition with each team meeting all others twice in eighteen regular premiership rounds to reach a top four who battled out four finals.

In round 1, Sydney's Nine Network made the first live telecast of an Australian rugby league match between Balmain and North Sydney from North Sydney Oval on 15 April. The second half of the match was beamed live with former international Ray Stehr the first commentator. There were only two cameras to capture the action, one positioned on each 25-yard line and cameramen frantically switched lenses depending on where play was located.

St. George won their eighth premiership, defeating Western Suburbs in the Grand Final. The Magpies again won the NSWRFL Club Championship this season.

Also this season the Jersey Flegg Championship was introduced.

The 1961 season also saw the retirement from the League of future Australian Rugby League Hall of Fame inductee, Keith Holman.

Teams

Regular season

Bold – Home game
X – Bye
Opponent for round listed above margin

Ladder

Ladder progression

Numbers highlighted in green indicate that the team finished the round inside the top 4.
Numbers highlighted in blue indicates the team finished first on the ladder in that round.
Numbers highlighted in red indicates the team finished last place on the ladder in that round.

Finals

Grand Final

Wests beat St George for the minor premiership on for-and-against and they were both ten points clear of their nearest rivals. If the Dragons run was to be stopped, this was the chance in legendary half Keith Holman's last match.

With misty rain on the day of the decider, Wests were knuckling down for another tight forward struggle as had been the case the major semi final also played in the wet. However, Saints stunned the Magpies as they ignored the conditions and threw the ball around.
 
The Dragons backline ran riot. Eddie Lumsden had a tremendous match, scoring three tries while Johnny King also scored another. Brian Clay, the best player on the field, cut loose against the veteran Holman who was playing in the unaccustomed five-eighth role. In every attacking raid there was an abundance of St George players backing up as the Wests' defence became more and more compressed.

St George scored three tries in a window of fifteen minutes to lead 15-0 at the 26-minute mark. The first was scored after nine minutes when Norm Provan from dummy-half passed to Johnny Raper who sent Clay away to the corner. Close to the sideline and fifteen metres before the try line, Clay called Lumsden inside him and snapped a reverse flick pass into the winger's hands enabling him to score untouched.

At the 21-minute mark from a St George scrum win Raper took the ball and ran toward King, he drew three defenders then lofted the ball to King who scored in the corner. Five minutes later a classic backline got the ball through the hands to Dave Brown who drew Barnsley in leaving Lumsden unmarked for his second try.

They took a 17-nil lead to the half-time break and the match appeared theirs. Fifteen minutes into the second half Lumsden scored again. St George then proceeded to lock up the game and Wests could not overcome the tough Dragons defence.

St George won their sixth Grand Final in a row, stunning Western Suburbs by 22-0. This victory enabled them to beat the previous record of Grand Final wins in a row, held by the South Sydney Rabbitohs.  It was Bob Bugden's last match for the Dragons. He had featured in all six wins.

St. George 22 (Tries: Lumsden 3, King. Goals: Graham 5.)

Western Suburbs 0

Player statistics
The following statistics are as of the conclusion of Round 18.

Top 5 point scorers

Top 5 try scorers

Top 5 goal scorers

Footnotes

External links
 Rugby League Tables - Season 1961 The World of Rugby League
 Writer, Larry (1995) Never Before, Never Again, Pan MacMillan, Sydney
 Big League, News Magazines for the National Rugby League June 13, 2006
Results:1961-70 at rabbitohs.com.au
1961 J J Giltinan Shield and WD HO Wills Cup at rleague.com
NSWRFL season 1961 at rugbyleagueproject.org
St. George 1961 season at showroom.com.au

New South Wales Rugby League premiership
NSWRFL season